The Estadi Nacional is a stadium located in Andorra la Vella. It is the national stadium of Andorra, and is used for association football and rugby union.

It has a capacity of 3,306, and the pitch is made of artificial turf.

History
The stadium was built at the former ground of the Camp d'Esports del M.I. Consell General. Construction started in 2013 and finished in 2014.

The stadium is the home of the Andorra national football team and the Andorra national rugby union team. The first official match was a 1–2 defeat to Wales valid for the UEFA Euro 2016 qualifying Group B, played on 9 September 2014, after the 3G artificial pitch passed UEFA inspection a week before the match.

In August 2015, the National Government and FC Andorra agreed that the club would play in the Estadi Nacional the two first months of the 2015–16 season, until the works in the Camp de la Borda Mateu finish.

In July 2021, the Government of Andorra reached an agreement with FC Andorra for playing their matches of Primera División RFEF in this stadium.

On 8 October 2021, one day before Andorra were due to play England in a 2022 FIFA World  Cup Qualifier - a fire broke out in the stadium's television gantry. There was extensive damage to the metal gantry and the television equipment within, one of the pitchside VAR monitors was destroyed, some of the seating in one of the dugouts melted and part of the artificial turf was scorched. Repairs were made in the following hours, so that the match was able to go ahead at the stadium, in spite of the fire.

Attendances to official games

Football games

SourceWorldfootball.net

Rugby games

References

External links
Estadi Nacional at EU-Football.info

Football venues in Andorra
Sport in Andorra la Vella
Andorra
2014 establishments in Andorra
Sports venues completed in 2014